Denisovo is a rural locality (a village) in Volosatovskoye Rural Settlement, Selivanovsky District, Vladimir Oblast, Russia. The population was 8 as of 2010.

Geography 
Denisovo is located 15 km northwest of Krasnaya Gorbatka (the district's administrative centre) by road. Matveyevka is the nearest rural locality.

References 

Rural localities in Selivanovsky District